North American camel may refer to:

Camelini, a tribe of mammals with several prehistoric genera which lived in North America, including:
Camelops
Megatylopus

Camelids